The Leader of the Opposition in the West Bengal Legislative Assembly is the politician who leads the official opposition in  the West Bengal Legislative Assembly.

Eligibility
Official Opposition is a term used in West Bengal Legislative Assembly to designate the political party which has secured the second largest number of seats in the assembly. In order to get formal recognition, the party must have at least 10% of total membership of the Legislative Assembly. A single party has to meet the 10% seat criterion, not an alliance. Many of the Indian state legislatures also follows this 10% rule while the rest of them prefer single largest opposition party according to the rules of their respective houses.

List of Opposition leaders

Deputy Leader of the Opposition

References

 
Leaders of the Opposition
West Bengal Legislative Assembly